Davidson may refer to:

 Davidson (name)
 Clan Davidson, a Highland Scottish clan
 Davidson Media Group
 Davidson Seamount, undersea mountain southwest of Monterey, California, USA
 Tyler Davidson Fountain, monument in Cincinnati, Ohio, USA
 USS Davidson, US Navy Frigate FF1045
 Davidson's penstemon (Penstemon davidsonii), species of Penstemon
 Davidson Institute for Talent Development, a US-based nationwide nonprofit organization established to support the needs of profoundly gifted children
 Davidson & Associates, a defunct video game publisher
 Davidson (footballer) (born 1991), Brazilian footballer

Places

Antarctica
 Cape Davidson, South Orkney Islands

Australia
 Davidson, New South Wales, Sydney
 Electoral district of Davidson, New South Wales Legislative Assembly

Canada
 Davidson, Saskatchewan
 Mount Skook Davidson in the Northern Rocky Mountains in British Columbia

United Kingdom
 Davidson's Mains, a suburb in Edinburgh, Scotland

United States
 Davidson, Indiana
 Davidson, North Carolina
 Davidson, Oklahoma
 Davidson County, North Carolina
 Davidson County, Tennessee
 Davidson Lake, a lake in Minnesota
 Mount Davidson (California)
 Davidson Township, Sullivan County, Pennsylvania
 Davidson Township, Iredell County, North Carolina

Education
 Davidson Academy, Tennessee, USA
 Davidson Academy of Nevada, USA
 Davidson College, North Carolina, USA
 Davidson High School (New South Wales), Sydney, Australia
 Rollo Davidson Prize, of Churchill College, Cambridge

Sports
 Davidson Wildcats, the athletic program of Davidson College

See also 
 Davutoğlu
 Davidson House (disambiguation)
 Davison (disambiguation)
 Davis (disambiguation)
 David (disambiguation)